Diego Alejandro García (born June 21, 1986 in La Paz (Entre Ríos), Argentina) is an Argentine footballer currently playing for Curicó Unido of the Primera División B in Chile.

Teams
  Quilmes 2007-2009
  Independiente Rivadavia 2009-2010
  Defensa y Justicia 2010-2011
  San Martín de San Juan 2011-2013
  Unión de Santa Fe 2014
  Atlético Tucumán 2014
  Curicó Unido 2015–2016
 Central Córdoba (Santiago del Estero) 2016
 Atlanta 2016-2017
 Almirante Brown 2017-2022
 Belgrano (Córdoba) 2022-presente

References
 Profile at BDFA 
 

1986 births
Living people
Argentine footballers
Argentine expatriate footballers
Quilmes Atlético Club footballers
Atlético Tucumán footballers
Unión de Santa Fe footballers
Defensa y Justicia footballers
San Martín de San Juan footballers
Independiente Rivadavia footballers
Curicó Unido footballers
Primera B de Chile players
Expatriate footballers in Chile
Association footballers not categorized by position
Sportspeople from Entre Ríos Province